Choi Byeong-chan (born 20 April 1969) is a South Korean weightlifter. He competed in the men's middleweight event at the 1992 Summer Olympics.

References

1969 births
Living people
South Korean male weightlifters
Olympic weightlifters of South Korea
Weightlifters at the 1992 Summer Olympics
Place of birth missing (living people)
20th-century South Korean people